In sports, a blowout is an easy or one-sided victory. It occurs when one athletic team or individual performer outscores another by a large margin or in such a fashion that allows the second team or individual little chance of a victory from a point early in a competition, game, contest or event, e.g. Team Frosties defeat Team Goose 9-1. The term is often used in reference to athletic competition, but it is used in other contexts such as electoral politics (see also the synonym landslide).

During blowouts, sports play-by-play announcers are challenged to maintain viewing and listening audience interest and ratings.  The announcers attempt to keep a stock of relevant informative discourse for such events.

Ethics and sportsmanship
During blowouts, some coaches and players are challenged by the ethics and sportsmanship of the event. Some believe it is not appropriate to give full effort when winning by a blowout margin, or "run up the score", and others believe that in athletic competition one is supposed to give full effort at all times. It can also be difficult for the losing team to keep their cool. Yelling/fights and players being removed from the game often take place when a team is being blown out because the losing team is frustrated and embarrassed.  During the portion of the game that is played after the outcome has been decided, which is known as garbage time, most teams rest many of their better players and play reserves who do not regularly play in their place.  This keeps the regular players from getting injured and gives them a chance to get some rest. It also gives the reserves a chance to get some experience under game conditions.  The fans often amuse themselves with chants about favorite teams and players that they want to see play during garbage time or teams that they look forward to playing in future rounds of playoff competition.

However in some sports, maintaining a large margin of victory must be done in order to retain the lead in statistical tiebreaker computations for playoff contention, and in other sports such as baseball, a strong inning or comeback win by the trailing team is always possible in pressure situations, due to the non-timed nature of the sport.

Notable blowouts
Some of the most one-sided sporting victories are given below:

American football (college). In the 1916 Cumberland vs. Georgia Tech football game, called "the biggest blowout in football history" by Los Angeles Times columnist Paul Aurandt in 1983, Georgia Tech defeated Cumberland College by a score of 222–0. Georgia Tech rushed for 1,650 yards and did not allow a first down by Cumberland.  In a record-setting season of blowouts, the 1901 Michigan Wolverines football team defeated its opponents over the course of the entire season by a combined score of 550–0.
American football (NFL). In 1940, the Chicago Bears beat the Washington Redskins 73–0 in the league's championship game. Chicago coach George Halas reportedly showed his players newspaper clippings in which the Redskins' owner called the Bears "crybabies and quitters" after the Redskins beat the Bears, 7–3, in the regular season. 
Australian rules football (AFL). In 1979, Fitzroy defeated Melbourne 238–48. 
Baseball (MLB). In 1897, the Chicago Colts of the National League defeated the Louisville Colonels, 36–7. The modern record (i.e., post-1900) for margin of victory was set in 2007, when the Texas Rangers defeated the Baltimore Orioles, 30–3. (The 30 runs are also a modern-era record for runs scored in a nine-inning MLB game by one team.)
 Basketball (NBA).  On December 2, 2021, the Memphis Grizzlies beat the Oklahoma City Thunder 152–79. 
 Canadian Football (CFL).  On August 24, 1959, the Edmonton Eskimos defeated the Saskatchewan Roughriders 55–0.  On July 29, 2017, the Calgary Stampeders defeated the Hamilton Tiger-Cats 60–1.
Canadian Football (IRFU).  In 1956, the Montreal Alouettes defeated the Hamilton Tiger-Cats 82–14.
Canadian Football (IRFU/WIRFU).  In the 1923 Grey Cup, Queen's University defeated the Regina Rugby Club 54–0.
 Club association football.  In 1885, Arbroath defeated Bon Accord of Aberdeen in a Scottish Cup match by a score of 36–0.  In 2002, the coach of Madagascar's Stade Olympique de l'Emyrne team staged a protest by directing his players to score at will—against themselves.  The final score was 149–0, with players on the winning team (Adema) not scoring any of the goals.
Cricket (Test format). In the fifth test of the 1938 Ashes Series, England defeated Australia by an innings and 579 runs. Winning the toss and choosing to bat first, England declared after scoring 903 runs for the loss of 7 wickets. In reply, Australia were bowled out for 201 runs in their first innings and 123 runs in their second innings. 
Cricket (ODI format). In 2008, New Zealand defeated Ireland by 290 runs. New Zealand's opening pair James Marshall and Brendon McCullum put on a first wicket partnership of 274 runs and batted through 42.2 overs. New Zealand posted a total of 402 runs for the loss of 2 wickets and bowled out Ireland for 112 runs in 28.4 overs.
Cricket (Twenty20 format).  In 2007, Sri Lanka defeated Kenya by 174 runs (201–27) in a match in Johannesburg, South Africa.
Golf (PGA Tour).  Three players have won PGA Tour matches by 16 strokes: J.D. Edgar at the 1919 Canadian Open; Joe Kirkwood Sr. at the 1924 Corpus Christi Open; and Bobby Locke at the 1948 Chicago Victory National Championship.  Tiger Woods has the largest margin of victory since 1950 with a 15-stroke win at the 2000 U.S. Open.
Horse Racing.  Secretariat won the 1973 Belmont Stakes by 31 lengths to win the Triple Crown.
 International association football. Micronesia was defeated by Vanuatu 46–0 in the 2015 Pacific Games. Micronesia conceded a total of 114 goals in the tournament.
 NASCAR racing. In 1965, Ned Jarrett won the Southern 500 at Darlington Raceway by 14 laps over 2nd place Buck Baker and 19 laps over 3rd and 4th-place finishers: Darel Dieringer and Roy Mayne. It is still the largest margin of victory in NASCAR.
 NHL ice hockey. On January 23, 1944, the Detroit Red Wings beat the New York Rangers 15–0.
 Olympic basketball. During the 1976 Summer Olympics, UPI described a 129–63 victory by the Soviet Union over Japan in men's basketball as "the most one-sided blowout of the current Olympic competition.".  In the highest scoring performance by any team in Olympic history, the U.S. men's basketball team beat Nigeria 156–73 in the 2012 Olympics.
 Rugby.  The Australian Wallabies defeated Namibia at the 2003 World Cup of Rugby by a score of 142–0.
 Tennis. In the 1974 US Open, Jimmy Connors defeated Ken Rosewall 6–1, 6–0, 6–1, the most lopsided defeat in any Grand Slam final.
 Tennis. At the 1988 French Open, Steffi Graf, en route to the first ever Calendar Golden Slam, successfully defended her title by defeating Natasha Zvereva 6–0, 6–0 in a 32-minute final. Natasha, who had eliminated Martina Navratilova in the fourth round, won only thirteen points in the match.
Women's hockey.  In 2008, Slovakia beat Bulgaria 82–0 in a 2010 Winter Olympics qualifying tournament.

Notes

External links

 For international association football:
 https://www.youtube.com/watch?v=VqdgCeTpT5s
 For American high school records (all sports):
 https://web.archive.org/web/20121207111039/http://www.nfhs.org/recordbook/
 For NCAA records (all sports):
 https://www.ncaa.org/wps/wcm/connect/public/NCAA/Resources/Stats/
 For NCAA baseball records in Divisions I, II, and III since 2001:
 https://web.archive.org/web/20131105061918/http://www.ncaa.org/wps/wcm/connect/public/NCAA/Resources/Stats/Baseball/RBindex.html
 For NCAA men's basketball records in Division I, II, and III since 2001:
 https://web.archive.org/web/20131105010653/http://www.ncaa.org/wps/wcm/connect/public/ncaa/resources/stats/m+basketball/rbindex.html
 For NCAA women's basketball records in Divisions I, II, and III since 2001:
 https://web.archive.org/web/20131105010202/http://www.ncaa.org/wps/wcm/connect/public/ncaa/resources/stats/w+basketball/rbindex.html
 For NCAA American football records in Divisions I (FBS and FCS) since 2004:
 https://web.archive.org/web/20131212044128/http://www.ncaa.org/wps/wcm/connect/public/NCAA/Resources/Stats/Football/RBindexI.html
 For NCAA American football records in Divisions II and III since 2004:
 https://web.archive.org/web/20131213030445/http://www.ncaa.org/wps/wcm/connect/public/NCAA/Resources/Stats/Football/RBindexII-III.html
 For NCAA men's hockey records in Divisions I and III since 2004:
 https://web.archive.org/web/20131219085309/http://ncaa.org/wps/wcm/connect/public/NCAA/Resources/Stats/Mens+Ice+Hockey/RBIndex.html
 For NCAA women's hockey records in Divisions I and III since 2004:
 https://web.archive.org/web/20131105012630/http://www.ncaa.org/wps/wcm/connect/public/ncaa/resources/stats/w+icehockey/rbindex.html

Terminology used in multiple sports